Ulmus thomasii, the rock elm or cork elm (or orme liège in Québec),  is a deciduous tree native primarily to the Midwestern United States. The tree ranges from southern Ontario and Quebec, south to Tennessee, west to northeastern Kansas, and north to Minnesota.

Etymology 
The tree was named in 1902 for David Thomas, an American civil engineer who had first named and described the tree in 1831 as Ulmus racemosa.

Description 
Where forest-grown, the crown is cylindrical and upright with short branches, and is narrower than most other elms. Rock elm is also unusual among North American elms in that it is often monopodial. The bark is grey-brown and deeply furrowed into scaly, flattened ridges. Many older branches have 3–4 irregular thick corky wings. It is for this reason the rock elm is sometimes called the cork elm.

The leaf surface is shiny dark green, turning bright yellow in autumn; the underside is pubescent.

Although U. thomasii is protandrous, levels of self-pollination remain high.

Ecology 
Ulmus thomasii is moderately shade-tolerant. Its preferred habitat is moist but well-drained sandy loam, loam, or silt loam soil, mixed with other hardwoods. However, it also grows on dry uplands, especially on rocky ridges and limestone bluffs.

Pests and diseases 
Like most North American elms, U. thomasii is very susceptible to Dutch elm disease.

Cultivation 
There are no known cultivars of Ulmus thomasii, nor is it known to be any longer in commerce. It appeared in some US nursery catalogues in the early 20th century.  The species is occasionally grown beyond its native range as a specimen tree in botanical gardens and arboreta, for example in northwestern Europe, but not commonly cultivated in northern Europe, being unsuited to the region's more temperate, maritime climate. However, the tree was propagated and marketed in the UK by the Hillier & Sons nursery, Winchester, Hampshire, from 1965 to 1977, during which time 49 were sold.

Ulmus thomasii was crossed experimentally with Japanese elm (U. davidiana var. japonica) at the Arnold Arboretum in Massachusetts, but no clones were released to commerce. Seedlings arising from crossings with Siberian elm (U. pumila) at the Lake States Forestry Experimental Station in the 1950s all perished, a classic case of hybrid lethality.

Notable trees 

Uses 
The wood of the rock elm is the hardest and heaviest of all elms, and where forest-grown remains comparatively free of knots and other defects. It is also very strong and takes a high polish, and consequently was once in great demand in America and Europe for a wide range of uses, notably boatbuilding, furniture, agricultural tools, and musical instruments.

Much of the timber's strength is derived from the tight grain arising from the tree's very slow rate of growth, the trunk typically increasing in diameter by less than  a year. Over 250 annual growth rings were once counted in a log  square being sawn for gunwales in an English boatyard, while a tree once grown at Kew Gardens, London, attained a height of only  in 50 years.

Accessions 
North America
Arnold Arboretum, Massachusetts, US. Acc. no. 444-88.
Brenton Arboretum, Dallas Center, Iowa, US. No acc. details available.
Dominion Arboretum, Ottawa, Canada. No acc. details.
Morton Arboretum, Illinois, US. Acc. no. 178-84, wild collected from Reedsville, Wisconsin; 843-2005 (Kelleys Island, Erie County, Ohio); 122-2006 (Dixon County, Nebraska).
Nebraska Statewide Arboretum, US. No details available.
Europe
Grange Farm Arboretum, Lincolnshire, UK. Acc. no. 706.
National Botanic Garden of Belgium, Meise, Belgium. Acc. no. 19800105.
National Botanic Gardens, Ireland, Glasnevin, Ireland. Location: A3 (155)
Sir Harold Hillier Gardens, Hampshire, UK.  Acc. no. 2008.0419, wild collected in Ontario, Canada, by Kristl Walek
Wakehurst Place Garden Wakehurst Place, UK. Acc. no. 1968-48603.

References

External links

 Arnold Arboretum specimen, 1960
  Labeled U. racemosa, RBGE specimen from Späth nursery, 1902  
  Labeled U. racemosa, RBGE specimen from Späth nursery, 1902  
  Labeled U. racemosa, RBGE specimen from Späth nursery, 1902

thomasii
Trees of the Northeastern United States
Trees of the Great Lakes region (North America)
Trees of the Plains-Midwest (United States)
Trees of Canada
Trees of the North-Central United States
Trees of Ontario
Trees of Quebec
Trees of the Southeastern United States
Ulmus articles with images
Elm species and varieties